Elsie May Zeile (1885-1988), also known as Elsie Zeile Lovegrove, was an American botanist.

References

1870 births
1940 deaths
American women botanists
19th-century American botanists
20th-century American botanists
20th-century American women scientists
19th-century American women scientists